is a 1963 Japanese film directed by Shue Matsubayashi, with special effects by Eiji Tsuburaya. The film is about Lt. Colonel Senda (Toshiro Mifune) who commands three fighter squadrons, eventually being dominated by Allied forces in June 1944.

Release
Attack Squadron! was released in Japan on 3 January 1963 where it was distributed by Toho. The film was Toho's second highest-grossing film of the year and the 9th highest-grossing domestic film production in Japan in 1963.

The film was released theatrically in the United States by Toho International with English subtitles on February 1, 1975. It was released to home video by Combat Home Video in 1988 as Kamikaze with an English-language dub. Stuart Galbraith IV commented on this release, stating that it was panned-and-scanned with "some of the wore telecine work ever done; the entire film appears to have been mastered showing only the extreme left side of the image."

Cast
 Toshiro Mifune as Senda
 Yūzō Kayama as Taki
 Yosuke Natsuki as Aaka
 Makoto Satō as Yano
 Kō Nishimura as Inaba
 Yuriko Hoshi as Miyako Tamai
 Ryō Ikebe as Mihara
 Akihiko Hirataas Katō
 Ichirō Nakatani as Nakamura
 Kiyoshi Atsumi as Tange
 Takashi Shimura as Koshirō Oikawa
 Jun Tazaki as Nakama
 Seiji Miyaguchi as Takijirō Ōnishi
 Susumu Fujita as Seiichi Itō

References

Footnotes

Sources

External links
 

Japanese World War II films
Toho films
Films directed by Shūe Matsubayashi
1960s Japanese films
World War II aviation films